Henry Holt may refer to:

Henry Holt (North Dakota politician) (1887–1944), lieutenant governor
Henry Holt (publisher) (1840–1926), American publisher and author 
Henry Holt and Company, Holt's publishing company
Henry E. Holt (born 1929), American astronomer
Henry H. Holt (1831–1898), Michigan politician, lieutenant governor
Henry W. Holt (1864–1947), Chief Justice of the Virginia Supreme Court
Henry Holt (American football) (1881–1955), American football player and banker

See also
Harry Holt (disambiguation)